The trondo mainty (Ptychochromoides betsileanus) is a critically endangered species of cichlid endemic to the Onilahy River Basin in southwestern Madagascar. Another cichlid from the same basin, Ptychochromis onilahy, is probably already extinct.

References

Trondo mainty
Freshwater fish of Madagascar
Fish described in 1899
Taxonomy articles created by Polbot
Endemic fauna of Madagascar